The Vermont attorney general is a statewide elected executive official in the U.S. state of Vermont who is elected every two years. It was created by an act of the Vermont General Assembly in 1790, repealed in 1797, and revived in 1904. The office began as a one-person operation located at Windsor, Vermont, the state's first capital. When the position was recreated in 1904 offices were located in the Vermont State House. The office is now headquartered in the Pavilion and is the largest employer of attorneys in the state. As of January 5, 2023, Charity Clark is the Vermont attorney general, having been elected in 2022.

The office provides legal counsel for all state agencies and the Vermont General Assembly, the state's legislative branch. It handles civil and criminal cases in all courts of the state for both the trial and appellate levels. It defends the state when it is sued and files suits to enforce Vermont’s criminal, environmental, consumer protection, civil rights and other laws.

Election
The attorney general was originally chosen by a vote of the Vermont General Assembly.  Since 1908 the attorney general has been elected every two years at the same time and in the same manner as other statewide elected officials.

List of Vermont attorneys general

References

External links
 
 Vermont Attorney General articles at ABA Journal
 News and Commentary at FindLaw
 Vermont Statutes at Law.Justia.com
 U.S. Supreme Court Opinions - "Cases with title containing: State of Vermont" at FindLaw
 Vermont Bar Association
 Vermont Attorney General William H. Sorrell profile at National Association of Attorneys General
 Press releases at Vermont Attorney General